The 1996 European Cup was the 17th edition of the European Cup of athletics.

The Super League Finals were held in Madrid, Spain.

Super League
Held on 1 and 2 June in Madrid, Spain

Team standings

Results summary

Men's events

Women's events

First League
The First League was held on 28 and 29 June

Men

Group 1
Held in Lisbon, Portugal

Group 2
Held in Bergen, Norway

Women

Group 1
Held in Lisbon, Portugal

Group 2
Held in Bergen, Norway

Second League
The Second League was held on 29 and 30 June

Men

Group 1
Held in Oordegem, Belgium

Group 2
Held in Tallinn, Estonia

Women

Group 1
Held in Oordegem, Belgium

Group 2
Held in Tallinn, Estonia

References

External links
European Cup results (Men) from GBR Athletics
European Cup results (Women) from GBR Athletics

European Cup (athletics)
European Cup
1996 in Spanish sport
International athletics competitions hosted by Spain